The Ray Harryhausen Awards are an annual film award for the best animated films of the previous year. Established by The Ray and Diana Harryhausen Foundation based in Edinburgh, the awards aim to recognise the achievements of contemporary animators, whilst celebrating the ongoing legacy of stop-motion animator Ray Harryhausen. The award statues are cast by Arch Bronze, who also sculpt the Laurence Olivier Awards.

Overview
The awards were originated by Foundation trustee John Walsh. They were announced at San Diego Comic Con 2021, with The Beat commenting that "...exciting things are happening at the Harryhausen Foundation, and the new film award announcement is sure to make an impact in the animation world." Walsh told the Puppet Place blog that he hoped that the awards would promote Ray's legacy alongside identifying new talent coming into the animation industry.

Ray Harryhausen's daughter Vanessa Harryhausen told Starburst Magazine that her father had always valued the educational value of his films, and hoped that the awards would continue to inspire new generations of artists.

Categories

References

External links
 Ray Harryhausen Awards official website
 The Ray and Diana Harryhausen Foundation
 The Ray Harryhausen Awards on IMDB

British film awards
Animation awards
Stop motion
2022 film awards
Works about Ray Harryhausen